Braund is a surname. Notable people with the surname include:

Allin Braund (1915–2004), English artist
Dorothy Mary Braund (1926–2013), Australian artist
George Braund (1866–1915), Australian soldier and politician
Len Braund (1875–1955), English cricketer
Rhiannon Braund, New Zealand academic and registered pharmacist